Mudrov is a Slavic masculine surname, its feminine counterpart is Mudrova. Notable people with the surname include:

 Sergey Mudrov (born 1990), Russian high jumper 
 Zuzana Mudrová (born 1993), Czech volleyball player

Slavic-language surnames